The Austonian is a residential skyscraper in Downtown Austin, Texas, USA. It is also the second tallest building in Texas outside of Houston and Dallas, and the second tallest all-residential building in North America west of the Mississippi River (both behind The Independent).

History
The Austonian's groundbreaking ceremony took place on August 31, 2007. On June 4, 2009, the 47th floor of the Austonian was poured, meaning the Austonian surpassed the Frost Bank Tower to become the second-tallest building in Austin, Texas.
On July 1, 2009, The Austonian overtook 360 Condominiums to become the tallest residential building in Austin. The building's exterior was finished in 2010, a period of almost 2.5 years since its groundbreaking. The Austonian opened to host the 2010 Women's Symphony League Designer Showhouse the weekend of May 15–16, 2010. The Showhouse was the last opportunity for the public to see the property before residents began moving in the building in June 2010. The Austonian received a four-star rating from Austin Energy Green Building in November 2010, making it the only residential high-rise building in Downtown Austin to receive such a rating.

In 2015, after a number of concrete spalls had fallen from balconies, it was discovered that the balconies had been constructed improperly - water was able to get into the steel rebar, causing them to rust and expand, due to the steel rebar being too close to the outside edge of the concrete slab. Repairs were estimated to cost in excess of $13 million, and were completed in 2019.

See also

 List of tallest buildings in Austin
 List of tallest buildings in Texas

References

External links
 Official website
 Official blog
 Austonian AustinTowers.net Profile

Residential skyscrapers in Austin, Texas
Residential condominiums in the United States
Residential buildings completed in 2010